is a railway station operated by the Isumi Railway Company's Isumi Line, located in Isumi, Chiba Prefecture Japan. It is 22.2 kilometers from the eastern terminus of the Izumi Line at Ōhara Station.

History
Fusamoto Station was opened on February 1, 1937 as the terminal station of the Japanese Government Railway (JGR) Kihara Line. Scheduled freight services were discontinued from September 1969 and the station has been unattended since May 10, 1974. With the division and privatization of the Japan National Railways (JNR) on April 1, 1987, the station was acquired by the East Japan Railway Company. On March 24, 1988, the Kihara Line became the Isumi Railroad Isumi Line. In 1992, the station building was completely rebuilt.

Lines
Isumi Railway Company
Isumi Line

Station layout
Fusamoto Station has a simple side platform serving bidirectional traffic. The station is unstaffed.

Platforms

Surroundings
National Highway Route 465

Adjacent stations

External links
  Isumi Railway Company home page

Railway stations in Japan opened in 1937
Railway stations in Chiba Prefecture